Live Hard may refer to:

Live Hard (EP), by Showbiz and A.G., 2007
Live Hard (film), 1989